The Anglican–Roman Catholic International Commission (ARCIC) is an organization created in 1969 which seeks to make ecumenical progress between the Anglican–Catholic dialogue. The sponsors are the Anglican Consultative Council and the Pontifical Council for Promoting Christian Unity (formerly the Secretariat for Promoting Christian Unity).

ARCIC seeks to identify common ground between the two communions. Ecumenical relations have become strained, owing to the ordination of women within the Anglican Communion and, in more recent years, the Anglican communion has internally become increasingly more divided over issues concerning homosexuality.

Preliminary phase: 1967–68
Three meetings were conducted by the Anglican–Roman Catholic Joint Preparatory Commission (ARCJPC) from 1967 to 1968. The first preparatory meeting was held in Italy, a meeting on the place of scripture in England and culminating in a meeting in Malta culminating in the Malta Report.

First phase: 1970–81
The first phase was conducted by the Anglican–Roman Catholic International Commission (ARCIC) from 1970 to 1982.

The first phase of ARCIC was held under the aegis of Henry McAdoo (Anglican Archbishop of Dublin) and Alan Clark (Roman Catholic Bishop of East Anglia). The co-secretaries were Anglicans Colin Davey and Christopher Hill and the Roman Catholic William A. Purdy.

In 1970 and 1971 there were a number of meetings on eucharistic doctrine, producing an agreed statement. An elucidation was issued in 1979.

In 1972 there was a meeting on the subject of ordination. It paved the way for an agreed statement from Canterbury. An elucidation was issued in 1979.

In the mid-1970s a number of meetings were held on the issue of authority culminating in a statement made at Venice. Further discussions on the subject of authority were held in 1977, 1979, and 1980; with elucidations and a further statement issued in 1981 with the final statement.

A final statement for "ARCIC I" was issued in 1981. There were responses from both the Lambeth Conference and the Catholic Church. Further clarifications on the Eucharist and Ministry were issued in 1993.

Second phase: 1983–2011

The second phase was conducted by the Second Anglican–Roman Catholic International Commission (ARCIC II) from 1983 to 2006. The second phase co-chairs were the Anglican bishops Mark Santer, Frank Griswold, and Peter Carnley; and the Roman Catholic bishops Cormac Murphy-O'Connor, and Alexander Joseph Brunett. A number of Anglican and Roman Catholic clerics served as co-secretaries.

The topics covered by  included the doctrine of salvation, communion, teaching authority, and the role of Mary the mother of God.

In 2000, ARCIC II supported a meeting of 13 pairs of Anglican and Roman Catholic bishops from around the globe at Mississauga, Ontario, Canada. This meeting set up the International Anglican—Roman Catholic Commission on Unity and Mission (IARCCUM), which began to meet in 2002, but was suspended from 2003–2005 in view of the consecration of an openly gay Anglican bishop in the USA.  is not about reaching theological agreement so much as finding ways to put into practice the agreements which ARCIC has reached and have been accepted by the two Churches.

In 2007 IARCCUM issued Growing Together in Unity and Mission which was the summary of the nine Agreed Statements of ARCIC. This states that "The Roman Catholic Church teaches that the ministry of the Bishop of Rome [the Pope] as universal primate is in accordance with Christ's will for the Church and an essential element of maintaining it in unity and truth." Not only that but the document goes on to say that "We urge Anglicans and Roman Catholics to explore together how the ministry of the Bishop of Rome might be offered and received in order to assist our Communions to grow towards full, ecclesial communion."

Third phase: 2011–present

The third phase started from 17–27 May 2011 at the ecumenical Bose Monastic Community in northern Italy. The third phase of ARCIC will be to consider fundamental questions regarding the Church as Communion – Local and Universal, and How in Communion the Local and Universal Church Comes to Discern Right Ethical Teaching. The opening meeting also noted Catholic—Anglican tensions over the creation of the Personal Ordinariate of Our Lady of Walsingham, directly subject to the Holy See, earlier the same year in order to make easier the transition by Anglican congregations (not just individuals) wishing to move into communion with the Catholic Church. The third phase has held several meetings.

The co-chairmen of this phase:
 Most Rev Bernard Longley, Archbishop of Birmingham (Roman Catholic)
 Most Rev Sir David Moxon, former Archbishop of New Zealand (Anglican)

Roman Catholic members: 
 Most Rev Arthur Kennedy, Auxiliary Bishop Emeritus of Boston
 Most Rev Robert Christian, OP, Auxiliary Bishop of San Francisco
 Very Rev Henry Wansbrough, OSB, professor at Liverpool Hope University
 Rev Vimal Tirimanna, CSsR, professor at the Alphonsianum University
 Rev , professor emeritus at Catholic University of Leuven
 Sr Teresa Okure, SHCJ, scholar-in-residence at Catholic Institute of West Africa
 Dr Paul Murray, professor at Durham University
 Dr Janet Smith, professor at Sacred Heart Major Seminary

Anglican members:
 The Rt Rev Dr Christopher Hill, president of the Conference of European Churches
 The Rt Rev Nkosinathi Ndwandwe, Suffragan Bishop of Natal
 The Rt Rev Linda Nicholls, Bishop of Huron
 The Rev Canon Dr Mark McIntosh, professor at Loyola University Chicago
 The Rev Canon Dr Michael Poon, professor at Trinity Theological College, Singapore
 The Rev Canon Dr Nicholas Sagovsky, canon theologian at Westminster Abbey
 The Rev Canon Dr Peter Sedgwick, former principal of St. Michael's College
 Dr Paula Gooder, canon chancellor of St Paul's Cathedral

Controversy

ARCIC has met with some hostile reaction from Traditionalist Catholics. Although ARCIC had just completed the major document on Marian theology in 2003, Pope John Paul II suspended official talks between the Roman Catholic Church and the Anglican Communion, owing to the consecration of Gene Robinson, a homosexual man in a non-celibate relationship, as a bishop in the Episcopal Church in the United States. 

Moreover, the ordination of women, especially to the episcopacy, has repeatedly been questioned by the Roman Catholic Church leadership as harmful to Christian unity. Walter Kasper, President of the Pontifical Council for Promoting Christian Unity, put it this way: The ordination of women to the episcopate "signified a breaking away from apostolic tradition and a further obstacle for reconciliation between the Catholic Church and the Church of England." He also seemed more upset about the warring parties within Anglicanism: "He described the legislation for those opposed to women's ordained ministry in the Church of England as the 'unspoken institutionalism' of an 'existing schism.'" 

At the opening of the May 2011 meeting, British journalist William Oddie claimed that ARCIC activities were useless, as only the Catholic side had a clear agenda and described all ecumenical activity as leading to a dead end. The ARCIC III Co Chairmen replied saying each communion was formally committed to continuing this sacred task at the highest level. They referred to substantial common ground while acknowledging the existence of significant obstacles, but said they trusted in the power of the Holy Spirit to draw the two communions closer.

See also
 Pope Benedict XVI and Ecumenism
 International Anglican–Roman Catholic Commission for Unity and Mission

Timeline

Notes

References

Further reading
 Greenacre, Roger, and Dennis Corbishley. Study Guide to the Final Report of the Anglican—Roman Catholic International Commission. London: Catholic Truth Society: S.P.C.K., 1982. N.B.: At head of title: "English Anglican/Roman Catholic Committee".

External links
 Anglican-Roman Catholic Dialogue Official website of the International Anglican-Roman Catholic Commission for Unity and Mission (IARCCUM)
 Anglican-Roman Catholic International Commission page on Anglican Communion website

Catholic–Protestant ecumenism
Anglican ecumenism
Christian ecumenical organizations